Mary Wirepa (1904–1971), also known as Mary Wi Repa, was a visual artist of Māori descent born in Auckland, New Zealand. She spoke partial Maori but mainly English.

Career 
Growing up Mary Wi Repa had a love of music and only began painting seriously around 1958, when she was in her 50s.  She developed a love of landscape painting, particularly romanticism combined with an interpretive realism. Wi Repa had planned to attend the Elam School of Fine Arts at the University of Auckland, and applied for a tuition grant from Māori Affairs, however she decided against attending.

Although of  Māori ancestry, Wi Repa preferred not to directly reference her culture, but rather to draw her inspiration from the environment around her. Her works often include cloud imagery or landscapes, including the piece Otoko, Gisborne (date unknown).  She believed her talent came through from her grand uncle Arthur Gundry who had been accepted into the Royal Academy of London in the 19th century who  had been mentored by Joseph Jenner Merrett.

Wi Repa exhibited at the Willeston Galleries (Wellington) in 1964 and her pieces are included in the Museum of New Zealand Te Papa Tongarewa.

Personal life 
Wi Repa married at the age of nineteen to Romio Wi Repa and had nine children while living in Whanarua Bay, the subject of many of her paintings. Four of her children were artists, namely first born Edward WiRepa Arthur Wi Repa, Kathleen Neenee, Rosemary Connell, Alice Bernadette Higgins as well as her grandson Ivan Wi Repa who was known as a classical pianist in the Māori music industry / community.

References

Further reading 
Artist files for Mary Wi Repa are held at:
 E. H. McCormick Research Library, Auckland Art Gallery Toi o Tāmaki
 Te Aka Matua Research Library, Museum of New Zealand Te Papa Tongarewa

1904 births
1971 deaths
New Zealand painters
New Zealand Māori artists
People from Auckland
People associated with the Museum of New Zealand Te Papa Tongarewa
New Zealand women painters
20th-century New Zealand women artists